Thomas Lance Sparrow (born 6 December 2002) is a Welsh professional footballer who plays as a midfielder for Hamilton Academical on loan from Stoke City. He is a Wales under-21 international.

Club career
Sparrow joined Stoke City from Wolverhampton Wanderers as a 14-year old. In October 2021 Sparrow joined National League North side AFC Telford United on a one-month youth loan. Sparrow made his professional debut on 7 May 2022 in a 1–1 draw against Coventry City. On 7 January 2023, Sparrow joined Scottish Championship side Hamilton Academical on loan for the remainder of the 2022–23 season, making his debut the same day in a 1–0 defeat away at Ayr United.

International
In September 2022 Sparrow made his debut for the Wales national under-21 football team in the 2-0 friendly match defeat against Austria under-21.

Career statistics

References

2002 births
Living people
People from Buckley, Flintshire
Sportspeople from Flintshire
Welsh footballers
Wolverhampton Wanderers F.C. players
Stoke City F.C. players
AFC Telford United players
Hamilton Academical F.C. players
Association football midfielders
English Football League players
National League (English football) players
Wales under-21 international footballers
Scottish Professional Football League players